The Central District of Nir County is in Ardabil province, Iran. At the 2006 census, its population was 12,607 in 3,043 households. The following census in 2011 counted 13,348 people in 3,661 households. At the latest census in 2016, the district had 12,190 inhabitants living in 3,720 households.

References 

Nir County

Districts of Ardabil Province

Populated places in Ardabil Province

Populated places in Nir County